George Quviq Qulaut (born c. 1954) is a Canadian politician elected to the Legislative Assembly of Nunavut in the 2013 election, where he served a full term MLA and Speaker representing the Amittuq district. He was born in Igloolik and represented the electoral district of Amittuq until his defeat in the 2017 election.

George joined the Qikiqtani Inuit Association (QIA) in January 2022.

He studied at Algonquin College in Ottawa and worked at the Igloolik Eastern Research Centre for 14 years. He was a QIA Community Director in Igloolik for 9 years, and Chairman of Qikiqtaaluk Corporation (QC).

References

Living people
Members of the Legislative Assembly of Nunavut
Inuit from the Northwest Territories
Inuit politicians
People from Igloolik
1954 births
Speakers of the Legislative Assembly of Nunavut
21st-century Canadian politicians
Inuit from Nunavut